Carphochaete durangensis is a species of Mexican  flowering plants in the family Asteraceae. They are native to Durango in north-western Mexico.

References

External links
photo of herbarium specimen at Missouri Botanical Garden, collected in Durango, isotype of Carphochaete durangensis

Eupatorieae
Flora of Durango
Plants described in 1987